Tempi is a municipality in the Larissa regional unit, Thessaly, Greece. The seat of the municipality is the town Makrychori. The municipality was named after the Vale of Tempe.

Municipality
The municipality Tempi was formed at the 2011 local government reform by the merger of the following 5 former municipalities, that became municipal units:
Ampelakia
Gonnoi
Kato Olympos
Makrychori
Nessonas

References

Municipalities of Thessaly
Populated places in Larissa (regional unit)